Aguirre Passage, also variously known as Pasaje Marinero, Canal Aguirre Cerda or Aguirre Channel, is a marine channel between Lemaire Island and Danco Coast, permitting northern access to Paradise Harbor. The feature was navigated by the ship Belgica of the Belgian Antarctic Expedition, 1897–99, and was known to Norwegian whalers in the area from 1913. Chilean Antarctic Expeditions operated a science station on Waterboat Point at Aguirre Passage from 1951–73. Named by the Chilean Antarctic Expedition, 1950–51, after Don Pedro Aguirre Cerda, President of Chile, 1938–41.

Straits of Graham Land
Danco Coast